Non-Cognitive Aspects of the City: Live at the Iridium is a live album by the Art Ensemble of Chicago recorded in April, 2004 at the Iridium Jazz Club in New York City and released in 2006 on the Pi Recordings label. It features performances by Joseph Jarman, Roscoe Mitchell and Don Moye with trumpeter Corey Wilkes and bassist Jaribu Shahid replacing the late Lester Bowie and Malachi Favors Maghostut.

Reception
The Allmusic review by Scott Yanow states that "Some of the music on this two-CD set is almost hard bop although a bit eccentric; other selections meander a bit in sound explorations or percussion displays, and others find the group pushing ahead".

Track listing 
 Disc One
 "Song for My Sister" (Mitchell) - 17:00  
 "The Morning Mist" (Art Ensemble Of Chicago) - 6:47  
 "Song for Charles" (Mitchell) - 8:52  
 "On the Mountain" (Art Ensemble Of Chicago) - 19:25  
 "Big Red Peaches" (Mitchell) - 7:34  
 "Odwalla" (Mitchell) - 5:21
 Disc Two  
 "Erika" (Jarman) - 19:59  
 "Malachi" (Mitchell) - 9:01  
 "The J Song" (Jarman) - 11:46  
 "Red Sand Green Water" (Art Ensemble Of Chicago) - 14:28  
 "Slow Tenor and Bass" (Mitchell) - 2:27  
 "Odwalla" (Mitchell) - 3:59

Recorded live at Iridium, New York on April 2 & 3, 2004

Personnel 
 Roscoe Mitchell: soprano saxophone, alto saxophone, tenor saxophone, baritone saxophone, clarinet, flute, percussion 
 Joseph Jarman: soprano saxophone, alto saxophone, tenor saxophone, clarinet, flute, percussion 
 Famoudou Don Moye: drums, percussion 
 Corey Wilkes: trumpet, pocket trumpet, flugelhorn
 Jaribu Shahid: bass, electric bass

References 

Art Ensemble of Chicago live albums
2006 live albums
Pi Recordings live albums